Arthur Holmes Howell (3 May 1872 – 10 July 1940) was an American zoologist most notable for his field work on mammals and birds in Alabama, Arkansas, Florida, Georgia, Idaho, Illinois, Kentucky, Louisiana, Missouri, Montana, New Mexico, and Texas.

Howell was born in Lake Grove, New York. In 1889, he became a member of the American Ornithologists' Union. By 1895, he accompanied Vernon Bailey as field assistant during surveys in Montana, Idaho, Washington, and Oregon.

Howell described several mammals and birds, including the gray bat, the Cape Sable seaside sparrow, and the red-tailed chipmunk. In 1898, he visited Great Gull Island and confirmed the extinction of the Gull Island vole.

Howell published 118 works, including Birds of Arkansas (1911), Birds of Alabama (1924), and Florida bird life (1932)

See also
Passenger pigeon

References

External links
Biographical notes

American ornithologists
American mammalogists
1872 births
1940 deaths
Scientists from New York (state)
People from Suffolk County, New York